Encore Hollywood, was a post production facility headquartered in Hollywood, California.

History 

Encore Hollywood was created in 1985. It was part of Deluxe Entertainment Services Group Inc.'s network of facilities before its closure.

Encore VFX, is the only surviving business unit of Encore Hollywood, now part of Company 3/Method Inc.

The Encore Hollywood facility building at 6344 Fountain Ave, Los Angeles, CA 90028 was demolished in 2021.

Credits

Television credits 

 Alias
 Castle – ABC
 Drop Dead Diva - Sony
 Big Love – HBO
 House - Fox
 Lie to Me – Fox
 Melrose Place – CBS
 NCIS – CBS
 Elementary - CBS

Feature film credits 

 Night Watch (2004 film) (uncredited)
 The Hurt Locker
 Zombieland
 Casino Royale
 Spider-Man
 Primeval

References

External links 
 Encore Hollywood

Film production companies of the United States
Visual effects companies